Caudy's Castle is a rock pinnacle of Ridgeley (Oriskany) sandstone that stands 1,070 feet (326 m) above sea level over the Cacapon River near the Bloomery Pike (West Virginia Route 127) south of Forks of Cacapon in Hampshire County, West Virginia, United States. The rock formation is named after James Caudy, an early Hampshire County pioneer and settler who fought off an attack by fifteen Native Americans from the rock during the French and Indian War. Caudy's Castle is also known as the Castle Rock. The pillar lies on the southern end of its namesake, Castle Mountain.

References

External links
Caudy's Castle Rock - historical and topographical information

Landforms of Hampshire County, West Virginia
Landmarks in West Virginia
Rock formations of West Virginia